Brian Fortune  is an Irish actor.

Career
He is best known for his role as Othell Yarwyck in the HBO series Game of Thrones.

He has appeared in numerous Irish television and film projects, including Wrath of the Crows (2013) and A Nightingale Falling (2014). He also starred in Christian Blake (2008), The Inside (2012) and Cold (2013), by director Eoin Macken. He played the main character in the independent Irish film The Last Show (2015), directed by Rita Marie Lawlor.

Filmography

Film

Television

References

External links

21st-century Irish male actors
Living people
Irish male television actors
Irish male film actors
Year of birth missing (living people)